Regionstog A/S was a Danish railway company responsible for train operation on three private railway lines in Region Zealand: the Tølløse Line, the East Line and the Lolland Line. It was established in 2009 when Vestsjællands Lokalbaner A/S, Østbanen and Lollandsbanen A/S where merged. It merged with Lokalbanen A/S in 2015 to form the railway company Lokaltog A/S. Regionstog had administrative offices in Maribo and Holbæk.

Railway lines 
 Lollandsbanen (Nakskov-Nykøbing F.), which is 50.2 km long, was opened in 1874 and transports approx. 875,000 passengers.
 Østbanen (Køge-Faxe Ladeplads / Køge-Rødvig), which is 46.2 km. long, was opened in 1879, and transports approx. 900,000 passengers.
 Tølløsebanen (Holbæk)-Tølløse-Slagelse, which is 50.8 km. long, was opened in 1901, and transports approx. 555,000 passengers.
 Odsherredsbanen (Holbæk-Nykøbing Sj), which is 49.4 km. long, was opened in 1899, and transports approx. 1.1 million. passengers.

See also
 Lokalbanen
 DSB (railway company)
 S-train
 Rail transport in Denmark

References
http://www.regionstog.dk/om-regionstog

2009 establishments in Denmark
2015 disestablishments in Denmark
Companies based in Holbæk Municipality
Defunct railway companies of Denmark
Railway companies established in 2009
Railway companies disestablished in 2015